Centrostegia is a monotypic genus of plants in the family Polygonaceae with a single species in the southwestern United States and northwestern Mexico. Centrostegia thurberi is known by the common names Thurber's spineflower and red triangles. It is a petite herb with a distinct red coloration.

References

External links 

 Jepson Manual Treatment
 USDA Plants Profile
 Photo gallery

Flora of Mexico
Flora of the United States
Monotypic Polygonaceae genera